"Ding-A-Ling" is a song released by Bobby Rydell in 1960. The song spent 11 weeks on the Billboard Hot 100 chart, peaking at No. 18. Paired with its flip-side, Swingin' School, "Ding-A-Ling" reached No. 1 in Australia and No. 2 on Canada's CHUM Hit Parade, also co-charting with Swingin' School.

Chart performance

References

1960 songs
1960 singles
Bobby Rydell songs
Cameo Records singles
Songs with lyrics by Kal Mann
Songs written by Bernie Lowe
Songs written by Dave Appell